Occidozyga floresiana (common name: Flores Oriental frog) is a species of frog in the family Dicroglossidae.
It is endemic to Flores, Indonesia.

Its natural habitats are tropical dry forest, swamps, freshwater marshes, intermittent freshwater marshes, and seasonally flooded agricultural land.

Sources

Occidozyga
Amphibians of Indonesia
Endemic fauna of Indonesia
Taxonomy articles created by Polbot
Amphibians described in 1927